The Mercedes-Benz EQE (V295) is a battery electric executive car produced by German automobile manufacturer Mercedes-Benz Group. It is part of the Mercedes-Benz EQ family, and was presented at the Munich Motor Show 2021. The only model available at launch has been the rear-motor EQE 350. The U.S. will get one version simply called the Mercedes AMG EQE which is the same 617-hp EQE 53 4matic+ seen in Europe.

In February 2022, the high-performance Mercedes-AMG EQE 43 & 53 4MATIC+ versions were unveiled.

In March 2022, the EQE 350 4MATIC and EQE 500 4MATIC were unveiled. In July 2022, the cheaper EQE 300 version was unveiled.

Models 
The specifications include:

References

EQE
Cars introduced in 2021
Executive cars
Luxury vehicles
Sedans
Mercedes-EQ
Production electric cars